Michelle Li (born November 3, 1991) is a Canadian badminton player from Markham, Ontario. Li is the 2014 Commonwealth Games champion and the first Canadian to win an individual gold medal in women's singles badminton at the Commonwealth Games. She has won gold in both singles and doubles at the Pan American Games and won the singles and team event titles from the Pan American Badminton Championships. As a competitor for Ontario, Li also won singles, doubles, and mixed team titles at the 2011 Canada Winter Games.

Early life and education 
Michelle Li was born in Hong Kong to Chi Keung Li and Agnes Kwong; together with her brother Mark, they moved to Canada in 1997.
An active child, she started playing badminton at age 11 with her mom at the local community center.  A friend introduced her to her current club, where she began lessons and competing locally in small tournaments. She started competing internationally when she was around 17 years old.
Li graduated from Richmond Hill High School and is an undergraduate student at Rotman Commerce at the University of Toronto.

Career 
One of Li's early notable performances came at the 2011 Canada Winter Games in Halifax, Nova Scotia. There she won gold in the women's singles event and followed that performance with a gold in the doubles event with Alexandra Bruce. Due to this success, she was named the flag bearer for Team Ontario at the closing ceremonies for the games.

Later that year, Li was the gold medal winner in the women's doubles event alongside Bruce at the 2011 Pan American Games. Li would then go on the next day to win the women's singles competition, completing a second games double gold appearance that year, this time in Guadalajara.

At the 2012 Summer Olympics, Bruce and Li finished last in the round-robin portion of the women's doubles tournament, losing all three of their matches. However, the top two teams in the group were disqualified for attempting to intentionally lose matches so they would have an easier match-up in the quarterfinals. The duo was advanced to their quarterfinals, where they defeated Australia's Leanne Choo and Renuga Veeran. Bruce and Li finished in fourth place, the best Canadian finish in badminton at the Olympic Games.  In the singles event, Li was knocked out by Wang Yihan.

In 2013, Li entered the finals of the Macau Open Grand Prix Gold, defeating Hong Kong top player Yip Pui Yin in the semi-finals, making her the first Pan-American athlete to ever enter into a singles final of a Grand Prix Gold event since that series began in 2007. In 2014, she also entered into the quarter-finals of the All England Open Badminton Championships Super Series Premier, beating Tai Tzu-ying in the first round, making her, in 35 years, the first Canadian player to enter at least the quarter-finals of this prestigious tournament. Later in 2014, Li won the Canada Open Grand Prix, making her the first home player to win this title ever since it became a Grand Prix event.

Li won the gold medal at the 2014 Commonwealth Games, defeating Kirsty Gilmour of Scotland in the final. She thus became the first Canadian woman to win a singles gold in Commonwealth badminton.

At the 2015 Pan American Games, Li successfully defended her title, defeating fellow Canadian Rachel Honderich in the final.

In 2016, she qualified to represent Canada at the 2016 Summer Olympics but was defeated by P. V. Sindhu (21-19, 15-21, 17-21) and ranked 2nd in the group stage of women's singles.

Michelle also had several operations in 2016 to fix nagging injuries sustained earlier in her career. She took a year off in 2017 to heal from the operations and to focus on a comeback for 2018. After deeming herself fully fit, she entered the stage relatively quietly in 2018 until she made a landmark win against the 3rd seed Ratchanok Intanon in round 16 of the All England Open. She had not defeated Intanon previously. Michelle's progress was clear as she moved quickly around the court, playing much lighter on her feet than in previous years.

During the 2018 Thomas Uber Cup, Li again played well. She defeated India's Saina Nehwal, who she had not previously beaten, by 21–15, 16–21, and 16–21. Li spearheaded Canada to their first-ever Uber Cup quarterfinal, and she defeated Sung Ji-hyun (21–14, 21–15). Canada eventually lost 3–1 to South Korea.

In the 2019 Japan Open, Li played and defeated the No. 1 seed, Tai Tzu-ying (21–15, 15–21, 22–20), to reach the semis.

She qualified to represent Canada at the 2020 Summer Olympics but was defeated by Nozomi Okuhara (9–21, 7–21) in the round of 16.

In 2022, Li won a silver medal at the 2022 Commonwealth Games after defeating Kirsty Gilmour of Scotland in the semi-finals and losing to P. V. Sindhu in the final. In the same year, Li also made a breakthrough in the 2022 BWF World Championships by defeating the eighth seed, Ratchanok Intanon, again in the round of 16. Though she eventually lost to the Olympic gold medalist and Chinese player Chen Yufei, it marked her first time getting into the quarterfinals of the BWF World Championships since 2011.

Achievements

Commonwealth Games 
Women's singles

Pan American Games 
Women's singles

Women's doubles

Pan Am Championships 
Women's singles

Women's doubles

Mixed doubles

BWF World Tour (3 titles, 1 runner-up)
The BWF World Tour, which was announced on 19 March 2017 and implemented in 2018, is a series of elite badminton tournaments sanctioned by the Badminton World Federation (BWF). The BWF World Tours are divided into levels of World Tour Finals, Super 1000, Super 750, Super 500, Super 300 (part of the BWF World Tour), and the BWF Tour Super 100.

Women's singles

BWF Grand Prix (3 titles, 3 runners-up) 
The BWF Grand Prix had two levels, the Grand Prix and Grand Prix Gold. It was a series of badminton tournaments sanctioned by the Badminton World Federation (BWF) and played between 2007 and 2017.

Women's singles

  BWF Grand Prix Gold tournament
  BWF Grand Prix tournament

BWF International Challenge/Series (22 titles, 9 runners-up) 
Women's singles

Women's doubles

Mixed doubles

  BWF International Challenge tournament
  BWF International Series tournament

Performance timeline

Career overview

Individual competitions 
 Senior level

Record against selected opponents 
Record against Year-end Finals finalists, World Championships semifinalists, and Olympic quarterfinalists. Accurate as of 6 November 2022

References

External links 

 
 
 Badminton Canada profile PDF
 

1991 births
Living people
Hong Kong emigrants to Canada
Sportspeople from Markham, Ontario
Canadian sportspeople of Chinese descent
Canadian female badminton players
Badminton players at the 2012 Summer Olympics
Badminton players at the 2016 Summer Olympics
Olympic badminton players of Canada
Badminton players at the 2010 Commonwealth Games
Badminton players at the 2014 Commonwealth Games
Badminton players at the 2018 Commonwealth Games
Badminton players at the 2022 Commonwealth Games
Commonwealth Games gold medallists for Canada
Commonwealth Games silver medallists for Canada
Commonwealth Games medallists in badminton
Badminton players at the 2011 Pan American Games
Badminton players at the 2015 Pan American Games
Badminton players at the 2019 Pan American Games
Pan American Games gold medalists for Canada
Pan American Games bronze medalists for Canada
Pan American Games medalists in badminton
Medalists at the 2011 Pan American Games
Medalists at the 2015 Pan American Games
Medalists at the 2019 Pan American Games
Badminton players at the 2020 Summer Olympics
Medallists at the 2014 Commonwealth Games
Medallists at the 2022 Commonwealth Games